Retirement age differs in European countries and is a matter of debate across Europe, because of an aging population. It depends heavilly on the minimum duration of contribution which varies from 30 years (Germany) to 43 years (France).

Retirement age by country

See also
Pension
Retirement
Ageing of Europe
Demographics of Europe
Immigration to Europe
Population decline
Survey of Health, Ageing and Retirement in Europe

References

External links 
Sarkozy follows Europe in raising retirement age, 2010
Legal conditions for retirement in Europe
European retirement ages on the rise
Pension reform across Europe, 2010
Germany, France suggest EU-wide retirement age of 67, 2011
The Economist: retirement age in Europe should be raised to 70 years

Demographics of Europe
Economy of Europe